Alessandro Russo may refer to:

 Alessandro Russo (footballer, born 2001), Italian football player, goalkeeper
 Alessandro Russo (footballer, born 2003), Italian football player, midfielder